The Ludington and Northern Railway, also known as the Dummy Train, or the L&N, is a defunct railroad which operated in Mason County, Michigan between 1902 and 1982.

On March 12, 1895, the Epworth League Railway in Mason County was organized. On July 18, 1901, the name was changed to Ludington and Northern Railway when Justus Smith Stearns purchased it.

The Sargent Sand company began mining operations just north of Ludington and south of the Ludington State Park in 1936, selling sand to foundries and other businesses. When Sargent Sand purchased the Ludington & Northern Railway Company, the rails ran from Ludington to Epworth Heights, and continued to the southernmost boundary of the Ludington State Park. When Sargent Sand ceased mining operations, the railway fell into disuse. The L&N officially became an abandoned line on June 15, 1982.

See also 
Mason and Oceana Railroad

Notes

References

External links 
 Michigan's Internet Railroad History Museum
 Epworth Assembly
 Don's Rail Photos

Defunct Michigan railroads
Transportation in Mason County, Michigan
Railway companies established in 1901
Railway companies disestablished in 1982